Marc Rostan (born 30 November 1963, in Paris) is a French racing driver.

Successes:

 2015 – 3rd – Total 24Hours of Spa – Am
 2006 – 3rd – Le Mans Series – LMP2
 2004 – 3rd – Le Mans Endurance Series – LMP2
 2003 – 3rd – FIA Sportscar Championship – Class SR2
 1995 – 3rd – Le Mans 24Hours – LMP2 Class – Pole position
 1993 – 3rd – (Championnat de France de Formule 3b)
4 wins (Barcelona (twice), Monza, Brno) and 18 podiums

Racing record

Complete International Formula 3000 results
(key) (Races in bold indicate pole position) (Races in italics indicate fastest lap)

24 Hours of Le Mans results

References

http://www.europeanlemansseries.com/fr/news/clin-doeil-%C3%A0marc-rostan/610
http://www.motorsport.com/bes/photos/main-gallery/?sz=9&q=marc+rostan&s=-6&oft=48&p=2
https://www.driverdb.com/drivers/marc-rostan/

1963 births
Living people
French racing drivers
International Formula 3000 drivers
24 Hours of Le Mans drivers
Racing drivers from Paris
Blancpain Endurance Series drivers
FIA World Endurance Championship drivers
European Le Mans Series drivers
American Le Mans Series drivers
FIA GT Championship drivers
French Formula Three Championship drivers
24 Hours of Spa drivers

Audi Sport drivers
BMW M drivers
Greaves Motorsport drivers
Saintéloc Racing drivers
Boutsen Ginion Racing drivers
24H Series drivers
Lamborghini Super Trofeo drivers